Thanks for Nothing may refer to:

Albums
 Thanks for Nothing (Rosemary Clooney album) or the title song, "Thanks for Nothing (At All)", 1964
 Thanks for Nothing, by Funker Vogt, 1996

Songs
 "Thanks for Nothing", by Dope from Life, 2001
 "Thanks for Nothing", by the Downtown Fiction, 2011
 "Thanks for Nothing", by Fefe Dobson from Joy, 2010
 "Thanks for Nothing", by Go Radio from Do Overs and Second Chances, 2010
 "Thanks for Nothing", by Ligeia from Bad News, 2008
 "Thanks for Nothing", by My Passion from Corporate Flesh Party, 2009
 "Thanks for Nothing", by Napalm Death from Enemy of the Music Business, 2000
 "Thanks for Nothing", by Slaves on Dope from Inches from the Mainline, 2000
 "Thanks for Nothing", by Sum 41 from Does This Look Infected?, 2002
 "Thanks for Nothing", by Tribe of Judah from Exit Elvis, 2002

Other media 
 "Thanks for Nothing" (Grace Under Fire), a 1995 TV episode
 "Thanks for Nothing" (Martin), a 1993 TV episode
 Thanks for Nothing: The Jack Dee Memoirs, a 2009 book by Jack Dee
 Thanks for Nothing, a book by Laura Dower from the children's series From the Files of Madison Finn

See also 
 TFN (disambiguation)